Shillingbury Tales is a British television comedy-drama series made by ATV for ITV and broadcast 1980–81.

Comprising a single feature-length pilot and six one-hour episodes, the series deals with life in an idealised fictional English village and stars Robin Nedwell, Diane Keen, Nigel Lambert, Jack Douglas, John Le Mesurier, Bernard Cribbins and Trevor Howard.

It was preceded by a feature length pilot episode The Shillingbury Blowers starring Trevor Howard, broadcast 6 January 1980.

The series was written by Francis Essex and directed by Val Guest. Unusually for a British situation-comedy at that time it was recorded entirely on location on 16mm film and consequently there was no laughter track. Much of the filming took place in the village of Aldbury in Hertfordshire.

The show ended when ATV lost its franchise licence to broadcast and its replacement Central declined to continue production of the series. The series was broadcast in a number of countries around Europe.

Episodes

Pilot
The Shillingbury Blowers (6 January 1980) is a feature length (79 minutes - 90 mins with adverts) film starring Robin Nedwell.

Peter (Nedwell) and his wife Sally live in an idyllic half-timbered cottage in the village of Shillingbury.

The local brass band, the Shillingbury Blowers, is struggling to survive. A meeting of the village council, headed by John Le Mesurier, looks at the financial position of the band and debate the poor quality of the playing. Peter is brought in to replace the ageing conductor. Peter tells the band they are awful and they walk out.

A second meeting of the village council with two band members results in a work-to-rule where the band decide to remove all individuality. Ironically this solves the problem and the band get their first clap. When they reconvene in the pub, The Oddfellows Arms, they resolve to play with further restrictions. When they then decide to play staccato it unintentionally works very well. When the old bandleader Saltie (Trevor Howard) then returns as lead trumpet and plays very melodically this works very well in counterpoint.

Peter helps Jake (Jack Douglas), the lead cornet, deliver a calf on his farm and a new bond of trust is formed. However this night-time ordeal causes Jake to oversleep and he misses the bus taking the band to a competition. However he catches up in time and convinces the band to cease their work to rule and return to their original style of play, resulting in disaster.

Series 1
"The Shillingbury Tinker" (17 May 1981)
"The Shillingbury Melon" (24 May 1981)
"The Shillingbury Cloudburst" (31 May 1981)
"The Shillingbury Legend" (7 June 1981)
"The Shillingbury Miracle" (14 June 1981)
"The Shillingbury Daydream" (21 June 1981)

Cuffy
In 1983, A spin-off sequel series entitled Cuffy was made and broadcast by ATV's successor Central. The show this time focused on and around Bernard Cribbins's character Cuffy.

However the spin-off series didn't feature Robin Nedwell or Diane Keen as they had left to focus on other work at the time.

DVD release
The show was released on DVD by Network in 2005.

External links
 
 

1980s British comedy television series
1980 British television series debuts
1981 British television series endings
English-language television shows
Television shows shot at EMI-Elstree Studios
ITV television dramas
Television shows produced by Associated Television (ATV)
Television series by ITC Entertainment